Villa Santa may refer to:

Villa Santa Lucia, a comune (municipality) in the Province of Frosinone in the Italian region Lazio
Villa Santa Lucia degli Abruzzi, a small comune and town in the province of L'Aquila in the Abruzzo region of Italy
Villa Santa Maria, a town and comune in the province of Chieti, in the region of Abruzzo of southern Italy
Villa Santa Rita, a barrio (district) of Buenos Aires, Argentina
Villa Santa Rita de Catuna, a municipality and village in La Rioja Province in northwestern Argentina